Dahi baigana is an Odia dish prepared from dahi (yogurt) and eggplant especially during festivals. This dish can be prepared without using onion and garlic when they are not allowed in some auspicious festivals.

Ingredients
Apart from eggplant and yogurt, one may use vegetable oil or ghee, mustard seeds, cumin seeds (jeera), fenugreek seeds (methi), fennel seeds (pan mahuri), dry chilli (sukhila lanka maricha), curry leaves (bhrusanga patra), ginger, green chilli, salt and sugar.

Variations
Some variation of Dahi baigana is seen in Kashmiri cuisine as the Kashmiri version adds spice paste and a lot of chilli powder to  the dish. Such preparation is somewhat golden rather than being yellowish white.

See also
 Odia cuisine
 Recipe of Dahi Baigana

References

Odia cuisine
Indian cuisine
Yogurt-based dishes
Vegetarian dishes of India